Larachelus is an extinct genus of xinjiangchelyid turtle known from the Early Cretaceous (late Hauterivian to early Barremian stage) of Spain.

References

Testudinata
Prehistoric turtle genera
Hauterivian genera
Barremian genera
Early Cretaceous turtles
Early Cretaceous reptiles of Europe
Cretaceous Spain
Fossils of Spain
Fossil taxa described in 2012